is a Japanese manga series written and illustrated by Tenya Yabuno. It is based on the Level-5 video game series of the same title. The manga has been published by Shogakukan in CoroCoro Comic.

An anime television series based on the game aired on the TV Tokyo network from May 4, 2011. The series was produced by Level-5 in conjunction with TV Tokyo, Dentsu, and OLM.

Scenario
In the final season of Inazuma Eleven Go Series, Football Frontier International Vision 2 (FFI V2) is being held, and all the best school soccer teams gathered in hope to gain a place in Shinsei Inazuma Japan, Japan's new national soccer team. But things are getting out of control when instead of skilled players, 8 soccer players who are new to soccer are selected, along with Tenma, Tsurugi and Shindō. The team is deemed to be a failure by both audience and Shindō himself, so what is happening? Will Shinsei Inazuma Japan be able to shine on the world stage, or is it too bad to even win a match?

Later, as Shinsei Inazuma Japan advanced through the Asia premilinaries, a terrible truth unfolds—FFIV2 is actually the preliminaries of District A of an interplanetary tournament: Grand Celesta Galaxy. In order to save Earth from elimination, Earth Eleven must win through the tournament against all kinds of aliens...

Characters
Is the main protagonist of the Inazuma Eleven GO series. He is a midfielder and he later became the captain for Raimon when Shindou Takuto got hospitalized.In the Chrono Stone series, he became a midfielder and captain for Tenmas, Raimon, Entaku no Kishi, El Dorado Team 03, Chrono Storm and Shinsei Inazuma Japan (alternate timeline).In the Galaxy series, he was chosen to be a midfielder and captain for Japan's team, Inazuma Japan. After the truth was revealed behind the FFIV2, he became a midfielder and captain for Earth Eleven.

Is one of the main protagonists of the Inazuma Eleven GO series. He is a forward for Raimon, Raimon (Chrono Stone), Chrono Storm and later in Galaxy, a forward for Inazuma Japan and Earth Eleven.

Is a main protagonist of the Inazuma Eleven GO series. He was a forward, in the past, and midfielder and also the captain for Raimon. After he got hospitalized, he decided that Matsukaze Tenma should become captain for Raimon.In the Chrono Stone series, he became a defensive midfielder for Raimon, Entaku no Kishi, El Dorado Team 02, also being captain for the team, and for Chrono Storm.

Theme songs
Opening songs (Season 3/Galaxy)
Gachi de Katouze! (eps 1-17) by T-Pistonz+KMC
Chikyuu wo Mawase! (eps 18-32) by T-Pistonz+KMC
Supernova! (eps 33-?) by T-Pistonz+KMC

Ending songs (Season 3/Galaxy)
Katte ni Cinderella (eps 1-17) by Sorano Aoi (CV:Kitahara Sayaka) and Morimura Konoha (CV:Yuuki Aoi )
 Fashion☆Uchuu Senshi (eps 18-32) by Sorano Aoi (CV:Kitahara Sayaka) and Mizukawa Minori (CV: Ayahi Takagaki)
 Arashi Tatsumaki Hurricane (eps 33-?) by Sorano Aoi (CV:Kitahara Sayaka) and Kobayashi Yuu

Episode list

Reception
The Inazuma Eleven: Chrono Stone anime won the best title in the 34th Animage Grand Prix.

References

Inazuma Eleven (anime)
Inazuma Eleven episode lists
2013 anime television series debuts
Japanese children's animated sports television series
OLM, Inc.
TV Tokyo original programming